= Nice subgroup =

In algebra, a nice subgroup H of an abelian p-group G is a subgroup such that p^{α}(G/H) = 〈p^{α}G,H〉/H for all ordinals α. Nice subgroups were introduced by Hill (1967). Knice subgroups are a modification of this introduced by Hill & Megibben (1986).
